This is a list of the National Register of Historic Places listings in San Jacinto County, Texas.

This is intended to be a complete list of properties listed on the National Register of Historic Places in San Jacinto County, Texas. There are two properties listed on the National Register in the county. Both properties are also designated Recorded Texas Historic Landmarks.

Current listings

The locations of National Register properties may be seen in a mapping service provided.

|}

See also

National Register of Historic Places listings in Texas
Recorded Texas Historic Landmarks in San Jacinto County

References

External links

San Jacinto County, Texas
San Jacinto County
Buildings and structures in San Jacinto County, Texas